Mawlamyinegyun Township is a township of Labutta District in the Ayeyarwady Division of Myanmar. It has a population of 311,340 (2014).

Townships of Ayeyarwady Region